Good Bad & Ugly is a 2013 Indian Malayalam-language drama film directed by V. R. Rathish and starring Sreejith Vijay and Meghana Raj in the lead roles with Basil and Sanju in supporting roles.

Plot 
The film revolves around three youngsters, Jeevan, Shiva, and Anwar, who travel around a city during a hartal (labour strike) in Trivandram.

Cast 

Sreejith Vijay as Jeevan
Meghana Raj as Kavya
Basil as Shiva
Sanju as Anwar
Suraj Venjaramoodu as Benz Vasu
Krishna Kumar as Murthy Raj
Indrans as Arogya Swamy
Nandhu as Marthandan
Lintu Thomas as Shyama
Kochu Preman
Geetha Nair
Kiran Raj
Njekkad Rajan

Production 
The film is about a hartal, a labour strike. Sreejith Vijay and Meghana Raj were announced to portray the lead roles. Meghana Raj signed for the film along with several other films including Maad Dad, Red Wine, Up & Down: Mukalil Oralundu, and a Kannada film. Basil shot for the film after his cameo in Karmayodha (2012). He was last seen in the unsuccessful  Cinema Company (2012) and Kaashh (2012). Suraj Venjaramood and Krishna Kumar  were also announced to be playing pivotal roles.

Soundtrack 
The songs were composed by M. G. Sreekumar and the lyrics were written by Rajeev Allunkal and Sasikala Menon.

Release 
The film was scheduled to release in February 2013.

References

External links 

2013 drama films
2013 films
Indian drama films
2010s Malayalam-language films